The Crawfordsville Hoosiers were a minor league baseball team briefly based in Crawfordsville, Indiana in 1888. The Crawfordsville Hoosiers were charter members of the Independent level Central Interstate League, before relocating to Terre Haute, Indiana during the 1888 season. Baseball Hall of Fame member Bud Fowler played for the Hoosiers.

History
Crawfordsville, Indiana first hosted minor league baseball play in 1888. The Crawfordsville Hoosiers became charter members of the Independent level Central Interstate League. The Bloomington Reds, Danville Browns, Davenport Hawkeyes, Decatur, Dubuque, Lafayette, Peoria Reds and Rockford Rox joined the Crawfordsville Hoosiers as charter members in league play.

On May 1, 1888, the Crawfordsville Hoosiers began league play, with Baseball Hall of Fame member Bud Fowler on the roster, integrating the team. Fowler had previously been signed by the 1888 Lafayette team, but never appeared for the team after issues with his race arose from the team manager and Fowler asked to be released. Fowler then signed with Crawfordsville. Fowler was described in a local newspaper review of the players on the roster as "having graduated from Oberlin College with honors. He is well informed, has traveled extensively and is an absolute teatotaller." Fowler hit .294 for the 1888 season with the Hoosiers. 

On July 2, 1888, the Crawfordsville Hoosiers had a 21–21 record, playing under manager Albert Miller, when the franchise relocated to become the Terre Haute Hoosiers. The team ended the season in 3rd place with a 32–26 overall record, finishing 8.0 games behind the 1st place Davenport Hawkeyes when the league folded for the season on July 27 1888. Crawfordsville/Terre Haute player A.W. Snyder led the Central Interstate league with 6 home runs.

Crawfordsville, Indiana has not hosted another minor league team.

The ballpark
The name of the Crawfordsville minor league ballpark in 1888 is unknown.

Year–by–year record

Notable alumni
Bud Fowler (1888) Inducted,  Baseball Hall of Fame 2022
Belden Hill (1888)

See also
Crawfordsville Hoosiers players

References

External links
Crawfordsville - Baseball Reference

Defunct minor league baseball teams
Professional baseball teams in Indiana
Defunct baseball teams in Indiana
Baseball teams established in 1888
Baseball teams disestablished in 1888
Central Interstate League teams
Hoosiers